The William Stimpson House is a historic house at 22 Prospect Street in Wakefield, Massachusetts.  The -story timber-frame house was built sometime before 1795, probably by William Stimpson, son of the local doctor.  It has conservative Federal styling, most notably due to its central chimney rather than the more typical twin chimneys of the period.  The building's internal layout and two kitchen fireplaces suggest that it was built as a two-family residence.

The house was listed on the National Register of Historic Places in 1989.

See also
National Register of Historic Places listings in Wakefield, Massachusetts
National Register of Historic Places listings in Middlesex County, Massachusetts

References

Houses on the National Register of Historic Places in Wakefield, Massachusetts
Federal architecture in Massachusetts
Houses in Wakefield, Massachusetts